Airman first class (A1C) is the third enlisted rank in the United States Air Force, just above airman and below senior airman. The rank of airman first class is considered a junior enlisted rank, with the non-commissioned officers and senior non-commissioned officers above it.

Airman first class is a rank that has also been used by the U.S. Navy and the U.S. Coast Guard, although it is not currently in use. In documents about the history of U.S. armed forces, this rank is abbreviated as "A1C".

Etymology
Airmen first class are often nicknamed "dragonfly wings" due to the insignia's resemblance to that animal's two pairs of wings.

History
From 1947 to 1952, this rank was "air force corporal". From 1952 to 1967, it was "airman first class" (A1C) and was the E-4 paygrade rank. Also during 1952 to 1967, the E-1 rank was "airman", the E-2 rank was "airman third class" (A3C) and the E-3 rank was "airman second class" (A2C). In 1967, "airman first class" became the E-3 rank, with airman as the E-2 rank and sergeant as the E-4 rank.

Criteria
Promotion to airman first class occurs upon one or more of the following: 

Completion of 10 months time in the grade of airman (or earlier for airmen with specific specialities)
Completion of three years of the Junior Reserve Officers' Training Corps (JROTC) sponsored by any of the four branches of the service
Completion of two years of college-level Reserve Officer Training Corps (ROTC)
Earning the Billy Mitchell Award in the Civil Air Patrol
Completion of at least 45 semester hours or at least 67 quarter hours of accredited junior college/college credits. 
Agreeing to an extended-length enlistment (normally six years).

Those personnel who qualify for these early promotions to airman first class wear the insignia of this rank during their basic training graduation ceremonies at Lackland Air Force Base in San Antonio, Texas, except for those who signed up for an extended enlistment. They receive their promotions to airman first class twenty weeks after graduation from basic military training or graduation from their technical training schools, whichever comes first. Enlistees who have signed up for initial six-year enlistment periods have usually qualified and done so in return for a guarantee of up to two years of training in Department of Defense and Air Force schools in highly-technical specialities such as electronics, weapons systems, physician's assistant or nursing. To qualify for all of this, the enlistee must have graduated from high school and scored highly on Air Force technical aptitude tests. On the bottom line, they spend up to two years in training at the expense of the Air Force, and then they pay back by serving at least an additional four years after their schooling. They also get an early promotion to airman first class as additional compensation.

Those who are promoted to this level upon completion of basic training also receive a retroactive pay increment that brings them up to the E-3 pay grade corresponding to airman first class, going back to day one of their enlistment. In other words, they get paid as if they had enlisted as an airman first class. However, if for some reason they get expelled from basic training, they do not receive this extra pay, and just get paid as airmen basic for the time that they spent in the Air Force before getting discharged.

Airmen first class are considered to be fully adjusted to Air Force and military life, and their duties focus on efficiently and effectively carrying out their assignments and honing their job skills.

See also
 U.S. Air Force enlisted rank insignia
 United States military pay

Notes

References

Enlisted ranks of the United States Air Force
Air force ranks
United States military enlisted ranks